Walter Vincent Langland (born September 16, 1927) was an American politician in the state of Iowa.

Langland was born in Winneshiek County, Iowa. He was a dairy farmer. He served in the Iowa House of Representatives from 1967 to 1971 as a Republican.

References

1927 births
Possibly living people
People from Winneshiek County, Iowa
Farmers from Iowa
Republican Party members of the Iowa House of Representatives